Tuohy is a surname which may refer to:

 Dan Tuohy (born 1985), Irish rugby player
 Denis Tuohy (born 1937), television broadcaster, actor, newsreader, and journalist
 Edward Tuohy (1908-1959),  inventor of the Tuohy needle 
 John S. Tuohy, brigadier general in the United States Air Force
 Katelyn Tuohy (born 2002) high school distance running record holder
 Leigh Anne Tuohy (born 1960), American businesswoman and interior decorator, portrayed in the film The Blind Side
 Liam Tuohy (footballer) (born 1933), Irish footballer and manager
 Patrick Tuohy (1894–1930), Irish painter
 Sean Tuohy (born c. 1960),  American sports commentator, restaurateur and former college basketball player, husband of Leigh Anne Tuohy
 Tom Tuohy (1917–2008), noted for putting out a major fire in Britain's worst nuclear accident
 William Tuohy, American Pulitzer Prize–winning journalist and author
 Zach Tuohy (born 1989),  Australian rules football player

See also
 Tooey (disambiguation)
 Touhy (disambiguation)

Surnames of Irish origin